Cylindrepomus sexlineatus is a species of beetle in the family Cerambycidae. It was described by Schultze in 1934. It is known from Borneo and the Philippines.

References

Dorcaschematini
Beetles described in 1934